The women's marathon event at the 1994 Commonwealth Games was held in Victoria, British Columbia

Results

References

Marathon
1994
1994 in women's athletics
Comm
1994 Commonwealth Games